San Pédro Airport  is an airport serving San Pédro, Côte d'Ivoire.

Airlines and destinations

See also
Transport in Côte d'Ivoire

References

 OurAirports - San Pédro
 Great Circle Mapper - San Pédro
 Google Earth

Airports in Ivory Coast
Buildings and structures in Bas-Sassandra District
San-Pédro, Ivory Coast